The VIJA AG-12Si is a French aircraft engine, designed and produced by VIJA Aircraft Engines of Toulouse for use in ultralight and homebuilt aircraft.

The company was founded in 2004 and went out of business in about 2015, ending production.

Design and development
The engine is a four-cylinder four-stroke, in-line,  displacement, 16 valve, air-cooled, fuel injected motorcycle conversion, gasoline engine design, with a mechanical gearbox reduction drive with a reduction ratio of 2.55:1. It employs electronic ignition and produces  at 7100 rpm, with a compression ratio of 11.5.

Variants
AG-12Si
AG-12Sbi

Specifications (AG-12Si)

See also

References

External links
Official website archives on Archive.org

VIJA aircraft engines
Air-cooled aircraft piston engines
2000s aircraft piston engines